Batocera herbuloti is a species of beetle in the family Cerambycidae. It was described by Devecis in 1993. It is known from Borneo.

References

Batocerini
Beetles described in 1993
Beetles of Asia